Charles Wood, 1st Viscount Halifax  (20 December 1800 – 8 August 1885), known as Sir Charles Wood, 3rd Baronet, between 1846 and 1866, was a British Whig politician and Member of the British Parliament. He served as Chancellor of the Exchequer from 1846 to 1852.

Background
Halifax was the son of Sir Francis Wood, 2nd Baronet of Barnsley, and his wife Anne, daughter of Samuel Buck. He was educated at Eton and Oriel College, Oxford, where he studied classics and mathematics.

Political career
A Liberal and Member of Parliament from 1826 to 1866, Wood abandoned the seat of Great Grimsby and was returned in 1831 for the pocket borough of Wareham, probably as a paying guest, which arrangement enabled him to remain in London in preparation for the reading of the Reform Bill. He confided his views to his father: the reform is an efficient, substantial, anti-democratic, pro-property measure, but it sweeps away rotten boroughs and of course disgusts their proprietors. The main hope therefore of carrying it, is by the voice of the country, thus operating by deciding all wavering votes ... The radicals, for which heaven be praised, support us ...He voted meticulously for the bill at every stage, and it received the Royal assent in the following year.

Wood served as Chancellor of the Exchequer in Lord John Russell's government (1846–1852), where he opposed any further help for Ireland during the Great Famine there. In his 1851 budget, Sir Charles liberalized trade, reducing import duties and encouraging consumer goods. In the succeeding Tory government, the new Chancellor Benjamin Disraeli, a former protectionist, referred to Wood's influence on economic policy in an interim financial statement on 30 April 1852, setting a trend for the way budgets are presented in the Commons. This reduction in tariffs led to a noticeable increase in consumption. For Wood, Disraeli was 'petulant and sarcastic', qualities he disliked.

Wood later served as President of the Board of Control under Lord Aberdeen (1852–1855), as First Lord of the Admiralty in Lord Palmerston's first administration (1855–1858), and as Secretary of State for India in Palmerston's second government (1859–1866).  He succeeded to his father's baronetcy in 1846, and in 1866 he was elevated to the peerage as Viscount Halifax, of Monk Bretton in the West Riding of the County of York. After the unexpected death of Lord Clarendon necessitated a reshuffle of Gladstone's first cabinet, Halifax was brought in as Lord Privy Seal, serving from 1870 to 1874, his last public office.

Role in the Irish Famine
The Great Famine in Ireland (1845 to 1851) led to the death of 1 million, and over 1 million emigrating from the country. On 30 June 1846, Peel's Tories were replaced by a Whig government led by Lord John Russell. The government sought to embed free trade and laissez faire economics. Sir Charles Trevelyan, a senior civil servant at the Treasury, in close cooperation with Chancellor of the Exchequer Sir Charles Wood, sought to oppose intervention in Ireland. Extreme parsimony of the British Government towards Ireland while Wood was in charge of the Treasury greatly enhanced the suffering of those affected by famine. Wood believed in the economic policy of Laissez-faire and preferred to leave the Irish to starve rather than "undermine the market" by allowing in cheap imported grain. Wood also shared Trevelyan's anti-Irish, moralistic views, with Wood believing the famine should eliminate the "present habits of dependence", and obliging Irish property to support Irish poverty. Wood wrote to the lord lieutenant that the famine was not accidental, but willed, and would bring along a social revolution: "A want of food and employment is a calamity sent by Providence", it had "precipitated things with a wonderful impetus, so as to bring them to an early head". He hoped the famine would clear small farmers, and lead to a "better" economic system.

Wood's dispatch

As the President of the Board of Control, Wood took a major step in spreading education in India when in 1854 he sent a dispatch to Lord Dalhousie, the then Governor-General of India. It was recommended therein that:

 An education department was to be set in every province.
 Universities on the model of the London university be established in big cities such as Bombay, Calcutta and Madras.
 At least one government school be opened in every district.
 Affiliated private schools should be given grant in aid.
 The Indian natives should be given training in their mother tongue also.

In accordance with Wood's dispatch, education departments were established in every province and universities were opened at Calcutta, Bombay, and Madras in 1857, in Punjab in 1882, and at Allahbad in 1887.

Family 
Lord Halifax married Lady Mary Grey (3 May 1807 – 6 July 1884), fifth daughter of Charles Grey, 2nd Earl Grey, on 29 July 1829.  They had four sons and three daughters:

 Hon. Blanche Edith Wood (d. 21 July 1921) married 21 September 1876, Col Hon Henry William Lowry-Corry (30 June 1845 – 6 May 1927).
 Hon. Alice Louisa Wood (d. 3 June 1934)
 Charles Lindley Wood, 2nd Viscount Halifax (7 January 1839 – 19 January 1934)
 Hon. Emily Charlotte Wood (1840 – 21 December 1904) married Hugo Francis Meynell-Ingram (1822 – 26 May 1871) 
 Capt. Hon. Francis Lindley Wood, RN (17 October 1841 – 14 October 1873)
 Lt Col. Hon. Henry John Lindley Wood (12 January 1843 – 5 January 1903)
 Hon. Fredrick George Lindley Wood (later Meynell) (4 June 1846 – 4 November 1910)

Lady Halifax died in 1884. Lord Halifax survived her by just over a year and died in August 1885, aged 84. He was succeeded in his titles by his eldest son Charles, who was the father of Edward Wood, 1st Earl of Halifax.

References

Bibliography

External links 
 
 

1800 births
1885 deaths
People educated at Eton College
Alumni of Oriel College, Oxford
Chancellors of the Exchequer of the United Kingdom
Lords Privy Seal
Lords of the Admiralty
Secretaries of State for India
Members of the Privy Council of the United Kingdom
Viscounts in the Peerage of the United Kingdom
Wood, Charles
Wood, Charles
Wood, Charles
Wood, Charles
Wood, Charles
Wood, Charles
Wood, Charles
Wood, Charles
Wood, Charles
Wood, Charles
Wood, Charles
Wood, Charles
Wood, Charles
UK MPs who were granted peerages
Wood family
Members of the Parliament of the United Kingdom for Great Grimsby
Peers of the United Kingdom created by Queen Victoria
Presidents of the Board of Control
First Lords of the Admiralty